The Yijinholuo Formation is a geological formation in Inner Mongolia, China whose strata date back to the Early Cretaceous. Dinosaur remains are among the fossils that have been recovered from the formation.

Vertebrate paleofauna
 Otogornis genghisi - "Shoulder girdle forelimb elements."

See also

 List of dinosaur-bearing rock formations

References

Lower Cretaceous Series of Asia
Inner Mongolia